"Me and My Life" is a song by British band the Tremeloes, released as a single in August 1970 from their album Master. It peaked at number 4 on the UK Singles Chart, becoming the Tremeloes' final top-ten hit.

Reception
Reviewing for Record Mirror, Peter Jones wrote that it was "Definitely a change of style. Away, temporarily perhaps, with the happy old sing-along material and in with something much more thoughtful, more complex, more ambitious all the way round. But there's a strong basic beat anyway, and some of the instrumental gimmickry hits home with impact".

Track listing
7"
 "Me and My Life" – 3:06
 "Try Me" – 3:36

Charts

References

1970 singles
CBS Records singles
1970 songs
The Tremeloes songs
Song recordings produced by Mike Smith (British record producer)